The Mint Juleps, who first gained notice in 1986, is a six-piece all-female a cappella group from the east end of London. The group consists of four sisters: Sandra, Debbie, Lizzie and Marcia Charles, who were joined by two school friends, Julie Isaac and Debbie Longworth.  Before they were signed by Stiff Records, they had gained experience touring with Sister Sledge and Billy Bragg, kool & the Gang, Lenny Henry, Shalamar, Fine young Cannibals and they had sung back-up for Bob Geldof, the Belle Stars Alison Moyet, Al Green, Gabriel and Dr. Feelgood. Their debut album, One Time, were issued on Stiff Records in 1985. In 1990 they appeared in Spike Lee's TV production, Do It Acapella.  In 1994, Round Our Way saw a release in both the UK and US.

The group also provided lead and backing vocals on Mickey Hart's Mystery Box, which was released in 1996.

References

Musical groups established in 1986
Musical groups from London
Vocal ensembles